Mohammad Mehdi Nazari (born March 1, 1989) is an Iranian footballer who plays for Nassaji in the Persian Gulf League.

References

External links
Mohammad Mehdi Nazari at PersianLeague.com
 

1989 births
Living people
Iranian footballers
Fajr Sepasi players
Iran international footballers
People from Shiraz
Esteghlal F.C. players
Association football forwards
Nassaji Mazandaran players
Sportspeople from Fars province